Yolbaşı or Keferallab) is a village in the Midyat District of Mardin Province in Turkey. The village is populated by Kurds and the Mhallami and had a population of 3,249 in 2021.

The village is a former Assyrian settlement.

References 

Villages in Midyat District
Mhallami villages
Historic Assyrian communities in Turkey
Kurdish settlements in Mardin Province